The 1997/98 FIS Freestyle Skiing World Cup was the nineteenth World Cup season in freestyle skiing organised by International Ski Federation. The season started on 1 August 1997 and ended on 15 March 1998. This season included four disciplines: aerials, moguls, dual moguls and ballet. Dual moguls counted as season title and was awarded with small crystal globe separately from moguls.

Men

Moguls

Aerials

Ballet

Ladies

Moguls

Aerials

Ballet

Men's standings

Overall 

Standings after 29 races.

Moguls 

Standings after 8 races.

Aerials 

Standings after 10 races.

Ballet 

Standings after 6 races.

Dual moguls 

Standings after 5 races.

Ladies' standings

Overall 

Standings after 29 races.

Moguls 

Standings after 8 races.

Aerials 

Standings after 10 races.

Ballet 

Standings after 6 races.

Dual moguls 

Standings after 5 races.

References

FIS Freestyle Skiing World Cup
World Cup
World Cup